Homeryon is a genus of blind, deep-sea crustaceans. It is named after the blind Greek poet Homer and the genus Eryon, which contains fossil relatives of the modern Polychelidae. It was separated from the genus Polycheles in 2001, and contains only two species.

Homeryon armarium
It is listed as Data Deficient on the IUCN Red List.

Homeryon asper
Only a single specimen of Homeryon asper (formerly Polycheles asper) has ever been collected. It is now housed in the National Museum of Natural History of the Smithsonian Institution. H. asper is listed as Least Concern on the IUCN Red List.

References

Polychelida